The conservative wave, or blue tide, was a right-wing political phenomenon that occurred in the mid-2010s to the early 2020s in Latin America as a direct reaction to the pink tide.

After a decade of left-wing governments, they suffered their first major electoral losses. In Argentina, Mauricio Macri (liberal-conservative, center-right) succeeded Cristina Fernández de Kirchner (Peronist) in 2015. In Brazil, the impeachment of Dilma Rousseff, a socialist, resulted in her departure and the rise of Vice President Michel Temer to power in 2016, and later in 2018 to that of far-right congressman Jair Bolsonaro, who became President of Brazil. The researcher on Latin America Mariana Llanos, however, considers incorrect to "lump Macri, Pinera and Bolsonaro together." In Peru, the conservative economist Pedro Pablo Kuczynski succeeded Ollanta Humala, a socialist and left-wing nationalist who is considered to have shifted towards neoliberal policies and the political centre during his presidency. In Chile, the conservative Sebastián Piñera succeeded Michelle Bachelet, a social democrat, in 2018 in the same transition that occurred in 2010. In Bolivia, the conservative Jeanine Áñez succeeded Evo Morales amid the 2019 Bolivian political crisis. In Ecuador, the centre-right conservative banker Guillermo Lasso succeeded the deeply unpopular Lenín Moreno, a former leftist who shifted rightward and distanced himself from his predecessor, Rafael Correa; in doing so, Lasso became the first right-wing President of Ecuador in 14 years.

In the late 2010s and early 2020s, the conservative wave began to decline following left-wing victories, starting with the 2018 Mexican general election, the 2019 Argentine general election and the 2020 Bolivian general election, and later the 2021 Peruvian general election, 2021 Chilean presidential election, 2021 Honduran general election, the 2022 Colombian presidential election, which resulted in the first left-wing president in the country's history, and the 2022 Brazilian general election, in which former leftist president Luiz Inácio Lula da Silva, who had his political rights restored, defeated Bolsonaro.

The second Pink Tide, however, does not have the hegemony of the first one. Castillo in Peru moved to the center, Boric's popularity in Chile faded shortly after he started his presidency, and Fernandez is likely to lose the 2023 elections in Argentina. Economy analyst Nicolás Saldías considered that "If elections there were happening today, many of these 'pink' governments would disappear".

By country

Argentina 

In Argentina, the election of Mauricio Macri of the centre-right in November 2015 as President of Argentina brought a right-wing government to power, although the populist movements of Peronism and Kirchnerism, which are tied to its leader Cristina Fernández de Kirchner's popularity, initially remained somewhat strong. Marci, a former engineer and Buenos Aires mayor, cut energy subsidies, ended currency controls, and started other reforms that allowed Argentina to win back the favour of international financial markets. In October 2017, Macri established a more firm hold on power when many candidates of his Cambiemos party enjoyed victories in the 2017 Argentine legislative election.

A series of corruption scandals involving Macri and his allies developed during his presidential period, including six federal investigations for alleged money laundry, influence trafficking, and illegal increase of his family's wealth, while also being involved in the Panama Papers scandal. In 2017, Macri's pension reform faced massive protests in opposition that some members of the press described as the most violently repressed in Buenos Aires in decades. Media reporters have accused Macri's government of police brutality and political repression while handling these protests, as well as other recent protests.

In the 2019 Argentine presidential election, Macri lost to the left-leaning Alberto Fernández, who was sworn into office in December 2019.

Brazil 
In Brazil, a conservative wave began roughly around the time Dilma Rousseff won the 2014 Brazilian presidential election in a tight election, kicking off the fourth term of the Workers' Party in the highest position of government. According to political analyst of the Inter-Union Department of Parliamentary Advice, Antônio Augusto de Queiroz, the National Congress of Brazil elected in 2014 may be considered the most conservative since the re-democratization movement, citing an increase in the number of parliamentarians linked to more conservative segments, such as ruralists, the military of Brazil, police of Brazil, and religious conservatives. The subsequent economic crisis of 2015 and investigations of corruption scandals led to a right-wing movement that sought to rescue ideas from economic liberalism and conservatism in opposition to left-wing politics. At the same time, young liberals such as those that make up the Free Brazil Movement emerged among many others. For José Manoel Montanha da Silveira Soares, within a single real generation there may be several generations that he called "differentiated and antagonistic". For him, it is not the common birth date that marks a generation, though it matters, but rather the historical moment in which they live in common. In this case, the historical moment was the impeachment of Dilma Rousseff. They can be called the "post-Dilma generation".

Centrist interim President Michel Temer took office following the impeachment of Rousseff. Temer held 3% approval ratings in October 2017, facing a corruption scandal after accusations for obstructing justice and racketeering were placed against him. He managed to avoid trial thanks to the support of the right-wing parties in the National Congress. On the other hand, President of the Senate, Renan Calheiros, who was acknowledged as one of the key figures behind Rousseff's destitution and member of the centrist Brazilian Democratic Movement, was himself removed from office after facing embezzlement charges.

Far-right candidate Jair Bolsonaro of the Social Liberal Party was the winner of the 2018 Brazilian presidential election followed by left-wing former mayor of São Paulo, Fernando Haddad, of Luiz Inácio Lula da Silva's Workers' Party. Lula was banned to run after being convicted on criminal corruption charges and being imprisoned. Bolsonaro has been accused of racist, xenophobic, misogynistic, and homophobic rhetoric. Bolsonaro would later lose to Lula in the 2022 Brazilian presidential election after his political rights were restored, becoming the first sitting president to lose a bid for a second term since the possibility of reelection for an immediately consecutive term became permitted by a constitutional amendment.

Ecuador 

In Ecuador, the policies and legacy of left-wing former President Rafael Correa is controversial. His successor, Lenín Moreno, was elected in the 2017 Ecuadorian general election defeating conservative banker Guillermo Lasso; a recount was needed amid allegations of fraud. The presidency of Moreno was also seen as controversial due to his shift to the centre and neoliberal policies, overseeing controversial austerity measures in petroleum which sparked the 2019 Ecuadorian protests and his mishandling of the COVID-19 pandemic in Ecuador.

In the 2021 Ecuadorian general election, Lasso announced his third presidential campaign and eventually advanced to the run-off by a narrow second-place finish. The election was noted as it saw Lasso, a conservative banker against socialist economist and Correa ally Andrés Arauz. Arauz was seen as the front-runner for the run-off election with him leading in several polls two weeks prior to the election. In the April run-off, Lasso managed to defeat Arauz in what some media called an upset victory after winning 52.4% of the vote, while Arauz won 47.6% of the vote.

Guatemala 
In Guatemala, social democratic leader Alvaro Colom of the centre-left National Unity of Hope was elected president in the 2007 Guatemalan general election, being the only modern day leftist president in the country. Colom's successor, right-wing Otto Pérez Molina of the Patriotic Party, was forced to resign his presidency due to popular unrest, as well as corruption scandals that ended with his arrest. Following Molina's resignation, right-wing Jimmy Morales was elected into office following the 2015 Guatemalan general election. As of 2018, he was under investigation for illegal financing. Morales successor Alejandro Giammattei also experienced massive popular unrest, resulting in the 2020 Guatemalan protests.

Honduras 

In Honduras, Manuel Zelaya's turn to the left during his tenure resulted in the 2009 Honduran coup d'état, which was condemned by the entire region, including the United States. Years later after the coup, Zelaya said his overthrow was the beginning of the "conservative restoration" in Latin America.

After the coup, the next democratically elected president was right-wing Porfirio Lobo Sosa (2010–2014), then right-wing Juan Orlando Hernández of the conservative National Party of Honduras won the 2013 Honduran presidential election over left-wing Xiomara Castro (Zelaya's wife) by a slight margin. Soon after, Hernández reformed the Constitution of Honduras to allow himself to be candidate for immediate reelection (something until then forbidden by Honduran law) and ran as candidate for the 2017 Honduran presidential election in what some observers question as undemocratic, authoritarian-leaning, and corrupt.

During the election, Hernández' tight self-proclaimed victory over Salvador Nasralla of the opposition alliance, alongside accusations of voter fraud, caused massive riots throughout Honduras. The declaration of a curfew from the country was labeled as illegal by some jurists, and the violent repression of the protests left at least seven dead and dozens injured. Due to the general popular unrest and voter fraud allegations, the Organization of American States requested a new election to no avail.

Castro would eventually win the 2021 Honduran presidential election with Nasralla as her running mate, while Hernández was arrested and extradited on request of the United States for alleged involvement with the illegal narcotics trade.

Paraguay 

In Paraguay, the conservative, right-wing Colorado Party ruled the country for over sixty years, including the dictatorship of Alfredo Stroessner that lasted thirty-five years, from 1954 to 1989, and was supported by the United States.

Paraguay is one of the poorest countries of South America and lest developed countries according to the Human Development Index. This dominant-party system was temporarily broken in the 2008 Paraguayan general election, when practically the entire opposition united in the Patriotic Alliance for Change managed to elect Fernando Lugo, aformer Bishop and member of the Christian Democratic Party, as President of Paraguay. Lugo's government was praised for its social reforms, including investments in low-income housing, the introduction of free treatment in public hospitals, the introduction of cash transfers for Paraguay's most impoverished citizens, and indigenous rights. Nevertheless, Lugo did not finish his period as he was impeached, despite enjoying very high approval ratings and popularity. The impeachment of Lugo was rejected by the Inter-American Commission on Human Rights, condemned by both right-wing and left-wing governments, and considered a coup d'état by UNASUR and Mercosur, and treated accordingly with sanctions and suspensions for Paraguay. Lugo was later elected to the Senate of Paraguay and became President of the Senate. He was replaced by Vice President Federico Franco, who was distanced from Lugo by ideological reasons, opposed to the entry of Venezuela into the Mercosur, and was described as conservative.

The country's next democratically elected president after the 2013 Paraguayan general election, right-wing Horacio Cartes of the Colorado Party, described by human rights organizations as authoritarian and homophobic, attempted to reform the Constitution of Paraguay to allow himself to be re-elected indefinitely, which caused popular uproar and the 2017 Paraguayan crisis. Cartes was also the suspect of money laundry, as well as tax evasion scandals, being described as "significantly corrupt" by the United States. He served until 2018, and his successor following the 2018 Paraguayan general election was fellow conservative Mario Abdo Benítez.

Peru 
In Peru, Pedro Pablo Kuczynski won the 2016 Peruvian presidential election, with Peru becoming yet another country that departed from a centre-left government. In this election, the third candidate with major support was leftist candidate Verónika Mendoza of the Broad Front with 18% of votes. Following corruption investigations surrounding Odebrecht, the Congress of the Republic of Peru demanded Kuczynski to defend himself in a session, with Marcelo Odebrecht stating that Kuczynski's involvement with the company was legal compared to the illegalities performed by his leftist predecessor. Due to the corruption scandal, the first impeachment process against Pedro Pablo Kuczynski was started, but voted against by a slight margin in Congress.

After the Kenjivideos scandal in which videos were leaked to the public showing bribery from the Fujimorists to keep Kuczynski in office, Kuczyinski resigned on his own. Kuczynski's successor, centrist Martin Vizcarra, changed policies. Amid the 2019 Peruvian constitutional crisis, he dissolved Congress on 30 September, which angered Fujimorists. In the 2020 Peruvian parliamentary election, the main opposition parties Peruvian Aprista Party and Popular Force lost the majority in congress. The removal of Martín Vizcarra began after accuses of corruption. Many centrists and leftists were angry, as the conservative Manuel Merino took power in his place. This led to the 2020 Peruvian protests, and Merino resigned from office. Centrist Francisco Sagasti succeeded him. In the days leading to the run-off of the 2021 Peruvian presidential election, conservative candidate Keiko Fujimori had a slight lead in the polls over socialist candidate Pedro Castillo. On 19 July, Castillo was declared the winner in a close and highly contested election.

Reception

In Brazil 
On the political changes that were happening in the country, a collection of twenty essays organized by Felipe Demier and Rejane Hoeveler, titled The Conservative Wave – Essays on the Current Dark Times in Brazil, was launched in 2016. In the synopsis, it is emphasized the rootedness of reactionary thinking and practices in Brazilian state powers and Brazilian society in multiple dimensions as well as the challenges that the left will have to face. Many Brazilians who support Jair Bolsonaro's government believe that the Workers' Party and rampant corruption in Brazil are to blame for difficulties in the economy.

Head of the states and governments

Presidents 

Below are right-wing and centre-right presidents who have held office in Latin America since 2010. Jeanine Áñez was sworn in by those present in the senate without a required quorum during the 2019 Bolivian political crisis, and has been convicted, indicated with ‡.

Disputed conservative wave leaders 
The following right-wing and centre-right presidents and prime ministers are sometimes included as part of the conservative wave and sometimes excluded, either because the countries they lead are in the broader Latin America and the Caribbean region but are not technically part of Latin America or the leaders in question do not necessarily fit under the definition of the conservative wave.

Timeline
 Note: the timeline actually begins before the start of the wave in order to represent graphically the increase of conservative governments along the years.

AM = Alejandro Maldonado
MM = Manuel Merino
JQ = Jorge Quiroga

See also 
 Catholic Church in Latin America
 Evangelical political parties in Latin America
 Pacific Alliance
 Pasokification
 Tea Party movement

References 

2010s in South America
Conservatism in South America
Economic ideologies
Political neologisms
Political ideologies
Politics of South America
Right-wing populism in South America
2010s neologisms